Igor Panchenko (Russian: Игорь Владимирович Панченко; born 18 May 1963) is a Russian politician serving as a senator from the Tula Oblast Duma since 14 October 2021.

Igor Panchenko  is under personal sanctions introduced by the European Union, the United Kingdom, the USA, Canada, Switzerland, Australia, Ukraine, New Zealand, for ratifying the decisions of the "Treaty of Friendship, Cooperation and Mutual Assistance between the Russian Federation and the Donetsk People's Republic and between the Russian Federation and the Luhansk People's Republic" and providing political and economic support for Russia's annexation of Ukrainian territories.

Biography

Igor Panchenko was born on 18 May 1963 in Aleksin, Tula Oblast. In 1985, he graduated from Tula State University. After graduation, he started working at the Aleksinsky Plant of Heavy Industrial Fittings where he stayed for more than 30 years. On 3 October 2004, he was elected deputy of the Tula Oblast Duma of the 4th convocation. In 2009 and 2014, Panchenko was re-elected for the Tula Oblast Duma of the 5th and 6th convocations, consequently. On 30 September 2014, he became the senator from the Tula Oblast Duma. In 2019, he was re-elected for the same position.

References

Living people
1963 births
United Russia politicians
21st-century Russian politicians
Members of the Federation Council of Russia (after 2000)